In the Book of Genesis, Dinah was the seventh child and only daughter of Leah and Jacob, and one of the matriarchs of the Israelites. The episode of her violation by Shechem, son of a Canaanite or Hivite prince, and the subsequent vengeance of her brothers Simeon and Levi, commonly referred to as the rape of Dinah, is told in Genesis 34. 

In the apocryphal book, Testament of Job, Dinah is said to have been Job's second wife after the death of his first wife, who is referred to as "Sitidos".

In Genesis

Dinah is first mentioned in Genesis 30:21 as the daughter of Leah and Jacob, born to Leah after she bore six sons to Jacob. In Genesis 34, Dinah went out to visit the women of Shechem, where her people had made camp and where her father Jacob had purchased the land where he had pitched his tent. Shechem (the son of Hamor, the prince of the land) then took her and raped her, but how this text is to be exactly translated and understood is the subject of scholarly controversy.

Shechem asked his father to obtain Dinah for him, to be his wife. Hamor came to Jacob and asked for Dinah for his son: "Make marriages with us; give your daughters to us, and take our daughters for yourselves. You shall dwell with us; and the land shall be open to you." Shechem offered Jacob and his sons any bride-price they named. But "the sons of Jacob answered Shechem and his father Hamor deceitfully, because he had defiled their sister Dinah"; they said they would accept the offer if the men of the city agreed to be circumcised.

So the men of Shechem were deceived, and were circumcised; and "on the third day, when they were sore, two of the sons of Jacob and Leah, Simeon and Levi, Dinah's brothers, took their swords and came upon the city unawares, and killed all the males. They slew Hamor and his son Shechem with the sword, and took Dinah out of Shechem's house, and went away." And the sons of Jacob plundered whatever was in the city and in the field, "all their wealth, all their little ones and their wives, all that was in the houses."

"Then Jacob said to Simeon and Levi, 'You have brought trouble on me by making me odious to the inhabitants of the land, the Canaanites and the Perizzites; my numbers are few, and if they gather themselves against me and attack me, I shall be destroyed, both I and my household.' But they said, 'Should he treat our sister as a harlot? (Genesis 34:31).

Last mention of Dinah in the Bible
When Jacob's family prepares to descend to Egypt, Genesis lists the 70 family members who went down together (Genesis 46:8–27). Dinah is specifically listed, in verse 15 ("These are the sons of Leah, that she bore to Jacob in Padan Aram, and Dinah his daughter."). Dovid Rosenfeld states that "That is it. The Torah does not tell us anything about what happened to her for the remainder of her life, nor if she ever married and raised a family".

Origin of Genesis 34

Chapter 34 of the Book of Genesis deals primarily with the family of Abraham and his descendants, including Dinah, her father Jacob, and her brothers. The traditional view is that Moses wrote Genesis as well as almost all the rest of the Torah, doubtlessly using varied sources but synthesizing all of them together to give the Hebrews a written history of their ancestors. This view—which has been held for the past several thousand years, although it is not explicitly mentioned in either the Hebrew or the Christian Bible—holds that Moses included this story primarily because it happened and he viewed it as significant. It foreshadows later happenings and prophecies further along in Genesis and the Torah dealing with the two violent brothers.

Source-critical scholars speculate that Genesis combines separate literary strands, with different values and concerns, and does not pre-date the 1st millennium BC as a unified account. Within Genesis 34 itself, they suggest two layers of narrative: an older account ascribing the killing of Shechem to Simeon and Levi alone, and a later addition (verses 27 to 29) involving all the sons of Jacob. Kirsch argues that the narrative combines a Yahwist narrator describing a rape, and an Elohist speaker describing a seduction.

On the other hand, another critical scholar, Alexander Rofé, assumes that the earlier authors would not have considered rape to be defilement in and of itself, and posits that the verb describing Dinah as "defiled" was added later (elsewhere in the Bible, only married or betrothed women are "defiled" by rape). He instead says that such a description reflected a "late, post-exilic notion that the idolatrous gentiles are impure [and supports] the prohibition of intermarriage and intercourse with them." Such a supposed preoccupation with ethnic purity must therefore indicate a late date for Genesis in the 5th or 4th centuries BC, when the restored Jewish community in Jerusalem was similarly preoccupied with anti-Samaritan polemics. In Rofé's analysis, the "defilement" refers to interracial sex rather than rape.

In rabbinic literature
Midrashic literature contains a series of proposed explanations of the Bible by rabbis. It provides further hypotheses of the story of Dinah, suggesting answers to questions such as her offspring: Osnat a daughter from Shechem, and links to later incidents and characters.

One midrash states that Dinah was conceived as a male in Leah's womb but miraculously changed to a female, lest the maid-servants (Bilhah and Zilpah) be associated with more of the Israelite tribes than Rachel.

Another midrash implicates Jacob in Dinah's misfortune: when he went to meet Esau, he locked Dinah in a box, for fear that Esau would wish to marry her, but God rebuked him in these words: "If thou hadst married off thy daughter in time she would not have been tempted to sin, and might, moreover, have exerted a beneficial influence upon her husband". Her brother Simeon promised to find a husband for her, but she did not wish to leave Shechem, fearing that, after her disgrace, no one would take her to wife. However, she was later married to Job. When she died, Simeon buried her in the land of Canaan. She is therefore referred to as "the Canaanitish woman" (Genesis 46:10). Joseph's wife Asenath (ib.) was her daughter by Shechem.

Early Christian commentators such as Jerome likewise assign some of the responsibility to Dinah, in venturing out to visit the women of Shechem. This story was used to demonstrate the danger to women in the public sphere as contrasted with the relative security of remaining in private.

Simeon and Levi

On his deathbed, their father Jacob curses Simeon and Levi's "anger" (Genesis 49). Their tribal portions in the land of Israel are dispersed so that they would not be able to regroup and fight arbitrarily. According to the Midrash, Simeon and Levi were only 14 and 13 years old, respectively, at the time of the rape of Dinah. They possessed great moral zealousness (later, in the episode of the Golden Calf, the Tribe of Levi would demonstrate their absolute commitment to Moses' leadership by killing all the people involved in idol worship), but their anger was misdirected here.

One midrash told how Jacob later tried to restrain their hot tempers by dividing their portions in the land of Israel, and neither had lands of their own. Therefore, Dinah's son by Shechem was counted among Simeon's progeny and received a portion of land in Israel, Dinah herself being "the Canaanite woman" mentioned among those who went down into Egypt with Jacob and his sons (Genesis 46:10). When she died, Simeon buried her in the land of Canaan. (According to another tradition, her child from her rape by Shechem was Asenath, the wife of Joseph, and she herself later married the prophet Job.) The Tribe of Simeon received land within the territory of Judah and served as itinerant teachers in Israel, traveling from place to place to earn a living.

In the Hebrew Bible, the tribe of Levi received a few Cities of Refuge spread out over Israel, and relied for their sustenance on the priestly gifts that the Children of Israel gave them.

In medieval rabbinic literature, there were efforts to justify the killing, not merely of Shechem and Hamor, but of all the townsmen. Maimonides argued that the killing was understandable because the townsmen had failed to uphold the seventh Noachide law to establish a criminal justice system. However, Nachmanides disagreed, partly because he viewed the seventh law as a positive commandment that was not punishable by death. Instead, Nachmanides said that the townsmen presumably violated other Noachide laws, such as idolatry or sexual immorality. Later, the Maharal reframed the issue—not as sin, but rather as a war. That is, he argued that Simeon and Levi acted lawfully insofar as they carried out a military operation as an act of vengeance or retribution for the rape of Dinah.

Travel to Egypt
The Torah lists the 70 members of Jacob's family who went down together into Egypt (Genesis 46:8–27). Simeon's children include "Shaul the son of a Canaanitish woman" (verse 10). The medieval French rabbi Rashi hypothesized that this Shaul was Dinah's son by Shechem. He suggests that after the brothers killed all the men in the city, including Shechem and his father, Dinah refused to leave the palace unless Simeon agreed to marry her and remove her shame (according to Nachmanides, she only lived in his house and did not have sex with him). Therefore, Shaul is counted among Simeon's progeny, and he received a portion of land in Israel in the time of Joshua. The list of the names of the families of Israel in Egypt is repeated in Exodus 6:14–25 (including "Shaul the son of a Canaanitish woman", verse 15).

In culture

Symbol of black womanhood

In 19th-century America, "Dinah" became a generic name for an enslaved African woman. At the 1850 Woman's Rights Convention in New York, a speech by Sojourner Truth was reported on in the New York Herald, which used the name "Dinah" to symbolize black womanhood as represented by Truth:

Lizzie McCloud, a slave on a Tennessee plantation during the American Civil War, recalled that Union soldiers called all enslaved women "Dinah". Describing her fear when the Union army arrived, she said: "We was so scared we run under the house and the Yankees called 'Come out Dinah' (didn't call none of us anything but Dinah). They said 'Dinah, we're fightin' to free you and get you out from under bondage'." After the end of the war in 1865 The New York Times exhorted the newly liberated slaves to demonstrate that they had the moral values to use their freedom effectively, using the names "Sambo" and "Dinah" to represent male and female former slaves: "You are free Sambo, but you must work. Be virtuous too, oh Dinah!"

The name Dinah was subsequently used for dolls and other images of black women.

In literature
The novel The Red Tent by Anita Diamant is a fictional autobiography of the biblical Dinah. In Diamant's version, Dinah falls in love with Shalem, the Canaanite prince, and goes to bed with him in preparation for marriage. Simon and Levi, Jacob's sons, instigate the discord between Jacob and the men of the King of Shechem out of fear for their own prosperity, even though Dinah tells them the truth.

See also 
Rape in the Hebrew Bible

Notes

References

Further reading 
 Schroeder, Joy A. Dinah's Lament: The Biblical Legacy of Sexual Violence in Christian Interpretation Minneapolis: Fortress, 2007.

External links 

 Dinah's Abduction from a Jewish perspective at Chabad.org
 

Jacob
Book of Genesis people
Kidnapped people
Massacres in the Bible
Violence against women in Israel
Women in the Hebrew Bible
Mythological rape victims
Children of Jacob
Sexuality in the Bible